Graham is the name of the following places in the U.S. state of Indiana:
Graham, Daviess County, Indiana
Graham, Fountain County, Indiana